To cross one's fingers is a hand gesture commonly used to wish for luck.  Occasionally it is interpreted as an attempt to implore God for protection. The gesture is referred to by the common expressions "cross your fingers", "keep your fingers crossed", or just "fingers crossed". 

The use of the gesture is often considered by children as an excuse for telling a white lie. By extension, a similar belief is that crossing one's fingers invalidates a promise being made.

Origin
Courts of Mosaic law would often render verdicts with the phrase "May God have mercy upon your soul" to reaffirm God's supreme authority over the law. Most judges felt that while they could pass a sentence of death upon a person, they personally did not have the authority to destroy souls and that only God had the authority to do that. As a result, some judges would cross their fingers whenever they said the phrase as a result of concern for the criminal's soul as they said it as a prayer.

It has to be with the index and middle finger. Common usage of the gesture traces back to the early centuries of the Christian Church, and likely earlier. It is believed that in the early days of Christianity, people used it to signal their belief to others. Christians would also cross their fingers to invoke the blessing power associated with Christ's cross. In 16th-century England, people cross fingers or make the sign of the cross to ward off evil, as well as when people coughed or sneezed.

Related gestures

In Vietnam the gesture is considered rude, especially to another person. 
Referring to female genitals, it is comparable to the middle finger in American culture.

In German-speaking countries and also Sweden and Latvia the gesture is a sign of lying. Instead, wishing for luck is gestured by holding thumbs. The same gesture is used in many Slavic countries such as Poland, the Czech Republic, Slovakia, Bulgaria and ex-Yugoslav republics. In South Africa, Afrikaans speakers also have the related phrase "duim vashou" meaning "holding thumbs tightly".

In pre-Christian Western Europe, a related gesture had two people crossing their index fingers to form a cross, which represented perfect unity; this gesture was used to make wishes.

See also
Benediction
God bless you
Orans
Sacramentals
Sfiga
 Holding thumbs

References

External links 
 

Christian symbols
Christian terminology
Fingers
Fingers
Hand gestures
Luck
Lying
Sacramentals